The 1932 Montrose Burghs by-election was held on 28 June 1932.  The by-election was held due to the succession to the peerage of the incumbent Liberal National MP, Robert Hutchison.  It was won by the Liberal National candidate Charles Kerr.

References

Montrose Burghs by-election
Montrose Burghs by-election, 1932
Politics of Angus, Scotland
Montrose Burghs by-election
Montrose Burghs by-election
By-elections to the Parliament of the United Kingdom in Scottish constituencies